These are the results for the 40th edition of the Ronde van Nederland cycling race, which was held from August 21 to August 26, 2000. The race started in Den Bosch and finished in Landgraaf.

Stages

21-08-2000: Den Bosch-Den Bosch, 4 km

22-08-2000: Den Bosch-Utrecht, 180.7 km

23-08-2000: Utrecht-Hoorn, 185.5 km

24-08-2000: Bolsward-Leeuwarden, 91 km

24-08-2000: Leeuwarden-Leeuwarden, 20 km

25-08-2000: Harderwijk-Venlo, 186.2 km

26-08-2000: Blerick-Landgraaf, 227.6 km

Final classification

External links
Wielersite Results

Ronde van Nederland
Nederland
2000 in Dutch sport